The Princess was a golf tournament on the Challenge Tour, played in Sweden, from 2009 to 2011.

Winners

External links
Coverage on the Challenge Tour's official site

Former Challenge Tour events
Golf tournaments in Sweden